The Natchez Trace, also known as the Old Natchez Trace, is a historic forest trail within the United States which extends roughly  from Nashville, Tennessee, to Natchez, Mississippi, linking the Cumberland, Tennessee, and Mississippi rivers.

The trail was created and used by Native Americans for centuries, and was later used by early European and American explorers, traders, and emigrants in the late 18th and early 19th centuries. European Americans founded inns, also known as "stands", along the Trace to serve food and lodging to travelers. As travel shifted to steamboats on the Mississippi and other rivers, most of these stands closed.

Today, the path is commemorated by the  Natchez Trace Parkway, which follows the approximate path of the Trace, as well as the related Natchez Trace Trail.  Parts of the original trail are still accessible, and some segments are listed on the National Register of Historic Places.

Origins

Largely following a geologic ridge line, prehistoric animals followed the dry ground of the Trace to distant grazing lands, the salt licks of today's Middle Tennessee, and to the Mississippi River.  Native Americans used many early footpaths created by the foraging of bison, deer, and other large game that could break paths through the dense undergrowth.  In the case of the Trace, bison traveled north to find salt licks in the Nashville area.

After Native Americans began to settle the land, they blazed the trail and improved it further, until it became a relatively well-established path.  Numerous prehistoric indigenous settlements in Mississippi were established along the Natchez Trace.  Among them were the 2,000-year-old Pharr Mounds of the Middle Woodland period, located near present-day Tupelo, Mississippi.

The first recorded European explorer to travel the Trace in its entirety was an unnamed Frenchman in 1742, who wrote of the trail and its "miserable conditions".  Early European explorers depended on the assistance of Native American guides to go through this territory — specifically, the Choctaw and Chickasaw who occupied the region. These tribes and earlier prehistoric peoples, collectively known as the Mississippian culture, had long used the Trace for trade. The Chickasaw leader, Chief Piomingo made use of the trail so often that it became known as 'Piominko's Path' during his lifetime.

Development

Even before the 1803 Louisiana Purchase, President Thomas Jefferson wanted to connect the distant Mississippi frontier to other settled areas of the United States. To foster communication with what was then called the Southwest, he directed construction of a postal road to be built between Daniel Boone's Wilderness Road (the southern branch of the road ended at Nashville) and the Mississippi River.

The U.S. signed treaties with the Chickasaw and Choctaw tribes to maintain peace, as European Americans entered the area in greater numbers.  In 1801 the United States Army began trail blazing along the Trace, performing major work to prepare it as a thoroughfare.  The work was first done by soldiers reassigned from Tennessee and later by civilian contractors.  To emphasize American sovereignty in the area, Jefferson called it the "Columbian Highway."  The people who used it, however, dubbed the road as "The Devil's Backbone" due to its remoteness, rough conditions, and the frequently encountered highwaymen found along the new road.

By 1809, the trail was fully navigable by wagon, with the northward journey taking two to three weeks.  Critical to the success of the Trace as a trade route was the development of inns and trading posts, referred to at the time as "stands."

Many early United States settlements in Tennessee and Mississippi were created along the Natchez Trace. Some of the most prominent were Washington, Mississippi (the old capital of Mississippi); "Old" Greenville, Mississippi (where Andrew Jackson conducted domestic slave trade); and Port Gibson, Mississippi.  The Natchez Trace was used  during the War of 1812 and the ensuing Creek War, as soldiers under Major General Andrew Jackson's command traveled southward to subdue the Red Sticks and to defend the country against invasion by the British.

By 1817, the continued development of Memphis (with its access to the Mississippi River), and Jackson's Military Road (heading south from Nashville) formed more direct and faster routes to New Orleans. Trade shifted to either of these routes along the east or west of the area, away from the Trace.  As author William C. Davis wrote in his book A Way Through the Wilderness (1995), the Trace was "a victim of its own success" by encouraging development in the frontier area.

With the rise of steamboat culture on the Mississippi River after invention of the steam engine, the Trace lost its importance as a national road, as goods could be moved more quickly, more cheaply, and in greater quantity on the river.  Before the invention of steam power, the Mississippi River's south-flowing current was so strong that northbound return journeys generally had to be made over land.

Although many authors have written that the Trace disappeared back into the woods, much of it continued to be used by people living in its vicinity.  With large sections of the Trace in Tennessee converted to county roads for operation, sections of it continue to be used today.

Early 19th century

Though the Natchez Trace was used as a major United States route only for a brief span, it served an essential function for years.  The Trace was the only reliable land link between the eastern states and the trading ports of Mississippi and Louisiana.  All sorts of people traveled down the Trace: itinerant preachers, highwaymen, traders, and peddlers among them.

As part of the "Great Awakening" movement that swept the country in the late 18th and early 19th centuries, the "spiritual development" along the Trace started from the Natchez end and moved northward.  Several Methodist preachers began working a circuit along the Trace as early as 1800.  By 1812 they claimed a membership of 1,067 Caucasians and 267 African Americans.  The Methodists were soon joined in Natchez by other Protestant denominations, including Baptist missionaries and Presbyterians.

The latter accompanied the migration of Scots-Irish and Scots into the frontier areas.  Presbyterians and their frontier offshoot, the Cumberland Presbyterians, were the most active of the three denominations in this country area. They claimed converts among Native Americans.  The Presbyterians started working from the south; the Cumberland Presbyterians worked from the north, as they had migrated into Tennessee from Kentucky.

As with much of the unsettled frontier, banditry regularly occurred along the Trace.  Much of it centered around the river landing Natchez Under-The-Hill, as compared with the rest of the town atop the river bluff.  Under-the-Hill, where barges and keelboats put in with goods from northern ports, was a hotbed of gamblers, prostitutes, and drunken crew from the boats. Many of the rowdies, referred to as "Kaintucks," were rough Kentucky frontiersmen who operated flatboats down the river.  They delivered goods to Natchez in exchange for cash, and then sought gambling contests in Natchez Under-the-Hill. They walked or rode horseback the 450 miles back up the Trace to Nashville. In 1810 an estimated 10,000 "Kaintucks" used the Trace annually to return to the north for the start of another river journey.

Other dangers lurked on the Trace in the areas outside city boundaries.  Highwaymen (such as John Murrell and Samuel Mason) terrorized travelers along the road.  They operated large gangs of organized brigands in one of the first examples of land-based organized crime in the United States.

Stands along the trace

The inns or stands as they were called along the Natchez Trace, provided lodging for travelers from the 1790s to the 1840s. These stands furnished food and accommodations, and contributed to the spread of news, information and new ideas. The food was very basic: corn in the form of hominy was a staple, and in addition bacon, biscuits, coffee with sugar, and whiskey were served. Lodging was normally on the floor; beds were available only to a few due to many travelers and cramped conditions. Some travelers choose to sleep outdoors or on the porches.

Stands on the old Natchez Trace, from Nashville south to Natchez
Nashville
 Joslin's Stand, Tenn. 1797
 Gordon's Stand, with Gordon's Ferry across the Duck River, Tenn. 1802.
 Keg Springs Stand, Tenn. 1812
 Sheboss Place, Tenn. 
 Dobbin's Stand, Tenn. 1808
 Grinder's Stand, Tenn. 1808
McLish's Stand, Tenn. 1806
Young Factor's Stand, Tenn. 1805
McGlamery's Stand, Tenn.
Toscomby's Stand, Tenn.1810
 George Colbert's Stand and Colbert's Ferry across the Tennessee River, Ala. 1806

Buzzard Roost Stand, Ala. 1812 See:Levi Colbert
Levi Colbert's Stand, Ala.
Brown's Stand, Miss. 1815
Old Factor's Stand, Miss. 1812
Levi Kemp's Stand, Miss. 1825
James Colbert's Stand, Miss. 1812
Tockshish's Stand (McIntosh's Stand), Chickasaw Old Town, Miss.1797
Wall's Stand, Miss. 1811
Pigeon Roost Stand, Miss. 1800
Mitchell's Stand, Miss. 1806
French Camp, LeFleur's Stand, Miss. 1810
Hawkins's Stand, Harkin's Stand, Miss. 1811
Shoat's Stand (Choteau's Stand), Miss. 1811
Anderson's Stand, Miss.1811
Crowders Stand, Miss. 1813
Doak's Stand, Miss. 1810. See: Treaty of Doak's Stand.
Ward's Stand, Miss. 1811
Brashear's Stand, Miss. 1806. See: Ridgeland, Mississippi.
Jackson
Ogburn's Stand, Miss. 1810
Hayes's Stand, Miss. 1815
Dean's Stand, Miss. 1821
Red Bluff Stand, McRover's Stand, Smith's Stand, Miss.1806
Wooldridge's Stand, Miss.1806
Grindstone Ford, Miss. 1797
Port Gibson
Coon Box Stand, Miss. 
Greenville, Miss.
Uniontown, Miss.
Selserville, Miss.
Washington, Miss.
Natchez

Source:

Death of Meriwether Lewis

Meriwether Lewis, of the Lewis and Clark Expedition fame, died while traveling on the Trace. Then serving as appointed governor of the Louisiana Territory, he was on his way to Washington, D.C., from his base in St. Louis, Missouri.  Lewis stopped at Grinder's Stand (near current-day Hohenwald, Tennessee), for overnight shelter in October 1809.  He was distraught over many issues, possibly affected by his use of opium. He was believed by many to have committed suicide there with a gun.

Some uncertainty persists as to whether it was suicide.  His mother believed he had been murdered, and rumors circulated about possible killers. Thomas Jefferson and Lewis's former partner, William Clark, accepted the report of suicide.  Lewis was buried near the inn along the Trace. In 1848, a Tennessee state commission erected a monument at the site.

On the bicentennial of Lewis's death (2009), the first national public memorial service honoring his life was held; it was also the last event of the Lewis and Clark Expedition Bicentennial.

See also

 Natchez Trace State Park, Tennessee
 Trace State Park, Mississippi

Notes

References

Further reading 
 George, Linda, George, Charles (2001). The Natchez Trace, pp. 30 
 Hall, Robert Green (1914). The Natchez trace: a study in transportation and travel between the early west and southwest; University of Wisconsin, pp. 128 -- Ebook (full view)
 Jamison, Lena Mitchell (1938). The Natchez trace; University of Wisconsin—Madison, pp. 208 
 Kroll, Harry Harrison (2005). Perilous Journey; Kessinger Publishing, pp. 420,

External links

 National Park Service: Natchez Trace Parkway
 Natchez Trace Profile and Videos - Chickasaw.TV
 Natchez Trace Parkway at byways.org
 Lesson Plan: "Footprints in the Dust: The Natchez Trace"

 
Historic trails and roads in Alabama
Historic trails and roads in Mississippi
Historic trails and roads in Tennessee
Muscle Shoals National Heritage Area
Native American trails in the United States